Rhonda Jo Petty (born March 30, 1955) is an American pornographic actress. She is a member of the AVN Hall of Fame and the XRCO Hall of Fame.

Known life and known career
Petty was born in North Hollywood, California and raised in Chatsworth, California. Her first lead role was in Disco Lady, released in 1978, due to her physical resemblance to the at-the-time popular mainstream actress Farrah Fawcett. (She was, indeed, promoted as "the Farrah Fawcett look-alike," which was also a marketing point of Little Orphan Dusty, released at the same approximate time.) Suitably, another of her stage names, "Sarah Dawcett," traded off on that resemblance. However, Petty had obviously larger breasts than did the real Fawcett—a physical aspect the "look-alike" promotion glossed over.

Petty was popular because she was unique in the industry for her time during the 1970s; she shaved her private parts and she often took part in then unconventional fisting scenes.  She performed in numerous films with early porn icon John Holmes, in addition to performing often in lesbian scenes. Her career was at its height in the late 1970s and the early to middle 1980s.

Petty starred in the film which debuted Holmes's future wife, Laurie Rose, who was then using the stage name Misty Dawn; this was The Greatest Little Cathouse in Las Vegas, released in 1982. Petty "became one of [Laurie's] favorite actresses for the longest time."

The Internet Adult Film Database notes that Petty brought her adult-film career to a close in 1991.

References

External links
 Conversations with Rhonda Jo Petty (retrieved August 16, 2007)
 
 
 

Living people
American pornographic film actresses
Pornographic film actors from California
1955 births
21st-century American women